Guy Lenox Prendergast may refer to:
 Guy Lenox Prendergast (politician), British MP for Lymington, 1826–27
 Guy Prendergast (British Army officer) (died 1986), Saharan explorer and World War II British Army officer